Tot Ons Genoegen Rotterdam, known as TOGR was a Dutch football club founded in 1929, based in Rotterdam. It was dissolved on 11 June 2013. It competed 6 season the Hoofdklasse.

References

External links
 Official website

Defunct football clubs in the Netherlands
Football clubs in Rotterdam
Association football clubs established in 1929
1929 establishments in the Netherlands
Association football clubs disestablished in 2013
2013 disestablishments in the Netherlands